British Rail Telecommunications was created in 1992 by British Rail (BR). It was the largest private telecoms network in Britain, consisting of 17,000 route kilometres of fibre optic and copper cable which connected every major city and town in the country and provided links to continental Europe through the Channel Tunnel.

BR also operated its own national trunked radio network, providing dedicated train-to-shore mobile communications, and in the early 1980s BR helped establish Mercury Communications’ (now Vodafone) core infrastructure by laying a resilient figure-of-eight fibre optic network alongside Britain's railway lines, spanning London, Bristol, Birmingham, Leeds and Manchester.

Realising the enormous commercial potential, BR Telecommunications Limited (BRT) was created in 1992 to exploit its wayleave rights and to take responsibility for the management and maintenance of the industry's voice, data and radio networks associated with the operational running of the railway and its business needs.

BRT was bought by Racal Electronics in 1995 and became Racal-BRT. This merged with Racal Network Services (RNS) in 1997 to become Racal Telecom. Two companies, Thales Translink and Thales Fieldforce, evolved from Racal Telecom in 1999 and were merged into Thales Telecommunications Services (TTS) in April 2002. TTS provides specialist telecoms services to the UK transport market.

On 1 April 2009, under TUPE employment regulations, around 480 telecoms experts moved from Thales to Network Rail to maintain the telecoms network.

Early history 
In May 1837 William Fothergill Cooke (1806–1879) and Professor Charles Wheatstone (1802–1875) entered into a partnership, and on 10 June patented a five-needle telegraph for which five wires were necessary. The telegraph worked by deflecting any two of the needles at the same time to point to any one of 20 letters on the grid behind the needle. Sending and receiving messages was a slow process, as each word had to be spelt out. With only 20 letters on the grid, the spelling sometimes contained inaccuracies. On 25 July, Wheatstone's and Cooke's telegraph was demonstrated to the directors of the London and Birmingham Railway between Euston and Camden Town, a distance of just under a mile.

In 1839 the world's first commercial telegraph line using the Cooke and Wheatstone five-needle system was commissioned by the Great Western Railway and built between Paddington and West Drayton, a distance of 13 miles. It was working to Hanwell by 6 April and was completed to West Drayton on 9 April. The public could pay one shilling (5p) to view the telegraph and could send their own telegrams. The undertaking marked the first commercial use of electricity. The line was later extended to Slough, but when it was proposed to carry it to Bristol, the Directors of the railway company objected and the agreement with Cooke and Wheatstone was rejected. Eventually, it was agreed that Cooke was allowed to retain the wires in position on condition that he worked the system at his own expense and sent the railway signals free of charge.

Assets
This section briefly describes the assets that constitute British Rail's telecom systems and networks.

The fixed bearer network is at the core of railway communications and thus is vital to the operation of the railway. It provides essential circuits for signalling and electrification control systems, train radio systems, lineside communications, level crossing CCTV, and customer information systems as well as more general IT and business telephony needs.

The fixed bearer network infrastructure comprises transmission systems and telephone exchanges, linked by a fibre optic and copper cable network that is located mainly within trackside troughing routes.

British Rail had several analogue radio networks that supported mobile communication applications for drivers and lineside workers. These radio networks consist of base stations, antenna systems and control equipment. The National Radio Network (NRN) was developed specifically for the operational railway; it provides radio coverage for 98% of the rail network through 500 base stations and 21 radio exchanges.

The NRN offers full access to the BRT telephone network; public service telephone network (PSTN) dialling, including international, is also available. It can provide dedicated open channels on talk-through mode for incident management and an override priority facility to ensure that emergency calls are immediately connected to the railway's Train Control Offices (TCO) and Electrical Control Rooms (ECR). The NRN and ORN are based on analogue radio technology and provide a high level of coverage throughout the railway network for mobile communication at the trackside. The ORN offers facilities for driver emergency communication with the local train control office. The RETB system is based on similar technology as the NRN and ORN but provides data communication for signalling token block exchange as well as voice communication.

Secure communication between drivers and signallers is provided by the Cab Secure Radio (CSR) systems located in various parts of the country. This application of analogue radio technology is designed to offer complete radio coverage at the trackside within the limits of its deployment. Fixed communication at the trackside is provided by lineside communication systems. These systems are primarily provided for signallers' communication with drivers and the public, through telephones located on signal posts and at level crossings.

Signal Post Telephones (SPTs) and other lineside phones are linked to telephone concentrators at the signal box.

Special self-monitoring systems (PETS) are also provided for high-risk level crossings.

CCTV systems are provided on platforms where driver-only operation train services call and at some stations with sub-surface platforms. These self-contained systems comprise cameras, monitors, cabling and control equipment.

Voice recorders are also classed as telecoms assets.

Management and maintenance 
In the late 1960s the National Telecoms Plan (NTP) was launched which brought about a centrally managed (BRHQ) project to install a nationwide co-axial cable based 4 MHz system of transmission bearer services for voice and on-line real time data networks. This was completed in 1972.

The fixed network as we know it today was installed piecemeal as part of BR's electrification and signalling projects between 1972 and 1993.

Fault reporting is localised and system failure is generally only uncovered as a consequence of customer complaint. The fixed telecommunications network consists of a wide variety of mostly old technologies, some of which are obsolete.

As a result of the privatisation process, a significant proportion of the fixed telecommunications network is now provided through lease agreements with Global Crossing and it is maintained by the former BRT.

GSM-R

GSM-R radio systems are being introduced across Europe under EU legislation for interoperability. In the UK, Network Rail has established a stakeholder's board with cross industry representation to drive the UK implementation of GSM-R to replace the National Radio Network (NRN) and Cab Secure Radio (CSR) systems currently in use.

The Rail Safety and Standards Board are revising the current train-to-shore radio standard GO/RT3410, renumbering it as GE/RT8080, and developing a new standard GE/RT8081 that contains requirements that are specific to GSM-R. The Railway Group Standards are being developed to support the European Functional Requirements Specification and should be read in conjunction with this document.

The Network Rail National Project for the introduction of GSM-R plans for the radio service to be live nationwide by 2007, with the current radio systems switched off at the end of 2009. Britain's GSM-R network should be fully operational by 2013 at a cost of £1.2 billion. This cost though does not include the West Coast Main Line, where transmission equipment supplied by Marconi is maintained by Telent.

GSM-R addresses the relevant recommendations from several accident inquiries:

Clapham (1988)
Abbeyhill (1994)
Cowden (1994)
Ais Gill (1995)
Doncaster (1995)
Winsford (1999)
Ladbroke Grove (1999)
Llanbrynmair (2000)
Tregoss Moor (2000)
Hatfield (2001)

GSM-R is the bearer for the ERTMS signalling being introduced from 2010.

Locomotives
British Rail Telecommunications operated four British Rail Class 20 locomotives: 20075, 20128, 20131 and 20187.

References

Telecommunications companies of the United Kingdom
British Rail subsidiaries and divisions
British Rail infrastructure